Harry "Scud" East is a fictional character in the book Tom Brown's School Days. He is perhaps the closest friend of Tom Brown. His nickname is Scud because he is so quick on his feet. In the book he is referred to as East.

In the 1940 Hollywood film, Tom Brown's School Days, East is played by the child star Freddie Bartholomew. In the ITV adaption of Tom Brown's Schooldays starring Stephen Fry as Dr. Arnold and Alex Pettyfer as Tom Brown, Harry Michell portrays East.

In the 1861 novel Tom Brown at Oxford – a direct sequel to Tom Brown's School Days – East has joined the Army and serves with the (fictional) 101st Regiment in the Second Anglo-Sikh War, where he is wounded. He later emigrates to New Zealand.

East also appears in George MacDonald Fraser's Flashman series, being held captive in Russia alongside Flashman during the Crimean War in Flashman at the Charge, and later dying during the Indian Mutiny in Flashman in the Great Game.

Characters in British novels of the 19th century
Literary characters introduced in 1857
Fictional British Army personnel
Fictional war veterans
Child characters in literature